WTVR-TV (channel 6) is a television station in Richmond, Virginia, United States, affiliated with CBS and owned by the E. W. Scripps Company. Its studios are located on West Broad Street on Richmond's West End, and its transmitter is located in Bon Air near the studios of PBS member stations WCVE-TV and WCVW. WTVR-TV's former transmitter is located behind the station's studio, and only WTVR-FM broadcasts from that tower today. It still remains as part of WTVR-TV's history.

WTVR-TV is one of only a few stations in the country to have been affiliated with all three of the original major American television networks.

History

Early history
When the channel 6 license in Richmond came up for bids before the Federal Communications Commission (FCC), it was assumed that the license would go to either Larus and Brother Company, owner of WRVA, or Richmond Newspapers, owner of WRNL, since they were considered Virginia's leading broadcasters. However, for reasons that remain unknown, neither station submitted a bid. The only applicant was auto parts dealer Wilbur Havens and his Richmond Broadcasting Company, which already owned WMBG (AM 1380) and WCOD (98.1 FM). FCC approval was a mere formality, and WTVR debuted on April 22, 1948. It was the first television station to sign on in the state of Virginia, and the first south of Washington, D.C. It became an NBC affiliate June 1, 1948. For many years, it used a colorized version of its original ID slide to open newscasts. Then, as now, the station operated from a converted bus garage on West Broad Street, where WMBG had been based since 1939.

As it was one of the last stations to get a construction permit before an FCC-imposed freeze on new permits, WTVR was the only station in town until 1955. It carried programming from all four networks of the time—NBC, CBS, ABC and DuMont—but was a primary NBC affiliate. In 1953, WTVR switched to its current tower, a self-supporting  tower near its studios. The tower has long been reckoned as a fixture of the Richmond skyline.

Channel 6 finally got competition in 1955, when WXEX-TV (channel 8, now WRIC-TV) signed on from neighboring Petersburg and took the NBC affiliation. WTVR then had a brief stint becoming a primary CBS affiliate; this ended in 1956 when Larus-owned WRVA-TV (channel 12, now WWBT) signed on and took the CBS affiliation due to WRVA radio's long history as a CBS radio affiliate. WTVR then carried on as an ABC affiliate until 1960, when CBS cut a new deal with Havens due to channel 12's low ratings. WTVR has been with CBS ever since and is one of the few stations in the country to have been a primary affiliate of all of the "Big Three"  networks, like WWBT locally. During the late 1950s, the station was also briefly affiliated with the NTA Film Network. Although Richmond Broadcasting was nowhere near as large as Larus and Richmond Newspapers, WTVR's eight-year head start allowed it to become the ratings leader in Richmond for the better part of its first three decades on the air.

Havens sold WTVR, WMBG, and WCOD to Roy H. Park Communications in 1966, earning a handsome return on his original $500 investment when he started WMBG in 1927. After taking ownership of the properties, the radio stations adopted the TV station's "WTVR" call letters. When Park died in 1993, the company's assets were sold to a Lexington, Kentucky group of investors that sold the radio properties separately to various owners, with WTVR-AM-FM going to Clear Channel (now iHeartMedia) in 1995. WTVR-FM is now owned by Audacy, who acquired iHeartMedia's Richmond stations in 2017, while the AM station, bought by Salem Communications in 2001 and programmed as Christian talk, was later sold by Salem and is now Spanish religious station WBTK. The WMBG call letters are currently used on an AM radio station in Williamsburg, Virginia.

WTVR began suffering in the ratings in 1994 when CBS lost the rights to broadcast National Football League games to Fox (CBS returned to NFL broadcasting in 1998). However, it recovered by the turn of the century and since then has been a solid runner-up, sometimes waging a spirited battle for second place with WRIC in news ratings.

Raycom ownership
Park merged with Media General, the successor to Richmond Newspapers, in May 1997. However, Media General could not keep WTVR alongside its flagship newspaper, the Richmond Times-Dispatch, because FCC rules of the time did not allow cross-ownership of newspapers and television stations in the same market. As a result, Media General swapped WTVR to Raycom Media in exchange for WJTV in Jackson, Mississippi, its semi-satellite WHLT in Hattiesburg, Mississippi, and WSAV-TV in Savannah, Georgia, two months later.

WTVR-TV was the only CBS station between Richmond and Roanoke until WCAV-TV signed on in Charlottesville in 2004.

Local features and community programs have included "For Kids' Sake", "Paws for Pets", and Battle of the Brains and a 24-hour weather news channel called "CBS 6 Xtra" broadcast on broadband, digital cable, and digital sub-channel 6.2 in the area. The station carried Raycom's 24/7 music television format "The Tube" on WTVR-DT3 until its shutdown on October 1, 2007. In March 2011, WTVR-DT3 became the new home of CBS 6 Xtra, while 6.2 carries Antenna TV (see below).

Swap to Local TV; Tribune ownership; twice-aborted sales to Sinclair

On November 12, 2007, Raycom Media announced its intention to purchase the television broadcasting and production properties of Lincoln Financial Media, including rival WWBT. Because WWBT and WTVR ranked as two of the four highest-rated stations in the Richmond market, FCC rules required one of the stations to be divested. Raycom decided to keep the higher-rated WWBT and sell WTVR to another owner. On June 24, 2008, Hunt Valley, Maryland-based Sinclair Broadcast Group announced its intent to purchase WTVR and sell local Fox affiliate WRLH-TV (channel 35), which it had owned since 1996. However, the Justice Department, under provisions of a consent decree with Raycom Media, denied Raycom permission to sell WTVR-TV to Sinclair in August 2008.

On January 6, 2009, Raycom resolved the ownership issue by trading WBRC, the Fox affiliate for Birmingham and $83 million to Local TV LLC in exchange for WTVR-TV. The transfer closed on March 31, 2009. As a result of the trade, Local TV owned Virginia's two largest CBS affiliates; it already owned WTKR-TV, the CBS affiliate in Norfolk, the market just to the east of Richmond. Local TV added Hampton Roads CW affiliate WGNT in 2010 after buying it from CBS.

For three months after the swap deal was completed, WTVR's Web site remained in the old Raycom-era format. This changed in late June 2009, a few days after WBRC relaunched its Web site, when WTVR migrated its Web site to the Tribune Interactive platform used by the Web sites of other Local TV-owned stations. As of 2012, Local TV migrated its Web sites to WordPress.com VIP. On July 1, 2013, Local TV announced that its stations would be acquired by the Tribune Company. The sale was completed on December 27.

On August 21, 2015, WTVR-TV's newsroom was named in honor of Stephanie Rochon, who anchored the weeknight newscasts from 1999 to 2014. Rochon had died that June after a long struggle with cancer.

On May 8, 2017, Sinclair Broadcast Group announced that it would acquire Tribune Media for $3.9 billion, plus the assumption of $2.7 billion in debt held by Tribune. Similar to the situation in the late 2000s involving Raycom's purchase of Lincoln Financial Media, either WTVR or WRLH  would have to be sold to an independently operated station owner in order to comply with FCC local ownership rules. On April 24, 2018, in an amendment to the Tribune acquisition through which it proposed the sale of certain stations to both independent and affiliated third-party companies to curry the DOJ's approval, Sinclair announced that it would sell WRLH-TV and eight other stations – Sinclair-operated KOKH-TV in Oklahoma City, KDSM-TV in Des Moines, WOLF-TV (along with LMA partners WSWB and WQMY) in Scranton/Wilkes-Barre and WXLV-TV in Greensboro/Winston-Salem/High Point, and Tribune-owned WPMT in Harrisburg and WXMI in Grand Rapids – to Standard Media Group (an independent broadcast holding company formed by private equity firm Standard General to assume ownership of and absolve ownership conflicts involving the aforementioned stations) for $441.1 million. The transaction includes a transitional services agreement, through which Sinclair would have continued operating WRLH for six months after the sale's completion.

Less than one month after the FCC voted to have the deal reviewed by an administrative law judge amid "serious concerns" about Sinclair's forthrightness in its applications to sell certain conflict properties, on August 9, 2018, Tribune announced it would terminate the Sinclair deal, intending to seek other M&A opportunities. Tribune also filed a breach of contract lawsuit in the Delaware Chancery Court, alleging that Sinclair engaged in protracted negotiations with the FCC and the DOJ over regulatory issues, refused to sell stations in markets where it already had properties, and proposed divestitures to parties with ties to Sinclair executive chair David D. Smith that were rejected or highly subject to rejection to maintain control over stations it was required to sell. The termination of the Sinclair sale agreement places uncertainty for the future of Standard Media's purchases of WRLH and the other six Tribune- and Sinclair-operated stations included in that deal, which were predicated on the closure of the Sinclair–Tribune merger.

Sale to Nexstar Media Group and resale to Scripps
On December 3, 2018, Irving, Texas-based Nexstar Media Group—which has owned ABC affiliate WRIC-TV (channel 8) since January 2017 (it had been Media General's flagship station when that company merged with Nexstar)—announced it would acquire the assets of Tribune Media for $6.4 billion in cash and debt. Because WTVR-TV and WRIC-TV rank as two of the four highest-rated stations in the Richmond market, Nexstar could not acquire WTVR directly or indirectly; any attempt by Nexstar to indirectly assume the operations of WTVR through local marketing or shared services agreements could have raised additional regulatory hurdles that would have delayed closing the merger. As such, Nexstar had to sell either WTVR or WRIC to a separate, unrelated company to address the ownership conflict. On March 20, 2019, the Cincinnati-based E. W. Scripps Company announced it would purchase WTVR from Nexstar upon consummation of the merger, marking Scripps' entry into Virginia, as part of the company's sale of nineteen Nexstar- and Tribune-operated stations to Scripps and Tegna Inc. in separate deals worth $1.32 billion. The sale was completed on September 19.

Programming

Syndicated programming
Syndicated programming on WTVR includes The Jennifer Hudson Show and Access Hollywood among others.

News operation
WTVR was the overall ratings leader in Richmond until the late 1980s, when WWBT surpassed it, mainly in local news ratings and due to strength from WWBT's affiliation with NBC and its top rated prime time lineup then. For most of the time since then, the station has waged a spirited battle with WRIC for second place. During the late 1980s, early 1990s and into the 2000s, WTVR won numerous awards, including the RTNDA News Operation of the Year for two consecutive years.

On August 10, 2010, starting with the Noon newscast, WTVR became the second commercial station (behind WWBT) to broadcast local news in high definition. The change also came new graphics, music (an updated version of "The CBS Enforcer Music Collection" by Gari Media Group) and a new news set. On January 23, 2013, WTVR used on-air graphics that were also used on then sister station KDVR, a Fox affiliate in Denver, Colorado until April 20, 2015, when they debuted new graphics and music ("Moving Forward" by 615 Music) that are also used by sister station WTTV (which became a CBS affiliate in January of that year) in Indianapolis. These were changed to Scripps' standardized graphics package and custom-made music from Stephen Arnold Music, in September 2020, almost a year after the company bought the station.

Between 2016 and 2018, WTVR produced a half-hour newscast for then Washington, D.C., sister station WDCW, with presentation originated from the former's studios, along with reporter's based in Washington. It was cancelled on September 28, 2018, after Tribune announced budget cuts amid the failed Sinclair transaction.

Notable current on-air staff
Bill Fitzgerald – evening anchor

Notable former on-air staff
Cindy Hsu – reporter (now at WCBS-TV in New York City)
Mark Ovenden – sportscaster, now at KDLT-TV in Sioux Falls, South Dakota
Bob Woodruff – reporter (1992–1994), former co-anchor of ABC World News, now reporter for ABC News

Technical information

Subchannels
The station's digital signal is multiplexed:

The station became a charter affiliate of Antenna TV upon its launch in March 2011. It is carried on digital subchannel 6.2. Channel 6.3 had been carrying a loop of current weather maps and recorded weather forecasts until mid-2015 when it switched to live simulcasts of the station's newscasts with repeats of the most recent newscast airing when there wasn't a live newscast. The subchannel also airs required E/I programming on weekend mornings.

On April 11, 2022, WTVR-TV began hosting WUPV's 65.2 subchannel, as a result of WUPV converting to ATSC 3.0; in turn, WUPV simulcasts WTVR-TV in the ATSC 3.0 broadcast standard.

Analog-to-digital conversion
WTVR-TV shut down its analog signal, over VHF channel 6, in the late morning of June 12, 2009, after more than 60 years, the official date in which full-power television stations in the United States transitioned from analog to digital broadcasts under federal mandate. The station's digital signal remained on its pre-transition UHF channel 25. Through the use of PSIP, digital television receivers continues to display the station's virtual channel as its former VHF analog channel 6.  Prior to the transition, the audio component of WTVR-TV's analog channel 6 signal at 87.75 MHz had been heavily promoted as available to listeners tuning to 87.7 on a standard FM radio receiver. WTVR-TV lost this benefit of the analog channel 6 allocation when analog transmission ended. WTVR-TV ended its telecasts on analog channel 6 with "The Star-Spangled Banner", featuring images of WTVR-TV's history and the Raising the Flag on Iwo Jima. WTVR-TV moved its digital signal from the tower it shared with former sister station WTVR-FM to a shared tower with PBS member stations WCVE-TV and WCVW as a result of the 2009 analog to digital conversion.

Out-of-market cable coverage
Outside of the Richmond market, WTVR is carried on cable in Northern Virginia in Front Royal and Luray. In central Virginia, it is carried on service providers in Charlottesville, Fredericksburg, Madison and Staunton. In southside Virginia in Mecklenburg County, WTVR is carried near the North Carolina state line in Bracey along Lake Gaston. It is also carried in Chase City and South Hill.

Past cable coverage
In the 1970s and 1980s, WTVR was once received as far south in Halifax and Enfield in North Carolina. In southern Maryland, WTVR was once carried in Leonardtown, St. Mary's County.

References

External links
 Official website 
 History of WWBT Television in Richmond

1948 establishments in Virginia
Antenna TV affiliates
CBS network affiliates
Court TV affiliates
E. W. Scripps Company television stations
Ion Television affiliates
Scripps News affiliates
Television channels and stations established in 1948
TVR-TV